Fruita National Forest, located in Colorado, was established as the Fruita Forest Reserve by the U.S. Forest Service on February 24, 1906 with .  It became a National Forest on March 4, 1907. On July 1, 1908 Fruita was transferred to Uncompahgre National Forest and the name was discontinued. The tract was transferred to the Grand Mesa National Forest in 1924, where it is known as the Fruita Division.

References

External links
Forest History Society
Listing of the National Forests of the United States and Their Dates (from the Forest History Society website) Text from Davis, Richard C., ed. Encyclopedia of American Forest and Conservation History. New York: Macmillan Publishing Company for the Forest History Society, 1983. Vol. II, pp. 743-788.

Former National Forests of Colorado